Hunting is a 1991 Australian drama film written and directed by Frank Howson, starring John Savage, Kerry Armstrong (nominated for AFI Best Actress) and Guy Pearce.

Plot
An American tycoon, Michael Bergman, arrives in Melbourne and has an affair with Michelle, a married secretary.

Production
Frank Howson says it was a requirement of the investors that he cast an American in the lead. Filming began in Melbourne in April 1989, with the movie being called "Australia's Wall Street (1987)".

Soundtrack
Guy Pearce, as well as playing in the film recorded a single called The Promise. The music video featured scenes from the film.

References

External links
 
Hunting at Oz Movies

1991 films
Australian independent films
Films set in Australia
1990s English-language films
1990s Australian films